Agung Mulyadi (born 23 March 1997) is an Indonesian professional footballer who plays as a midfielder for Liga 1 club Persikabo 1973.

Club career

Persib Bandung
He made his professional debut in the Liga 1 on May 7, 2017 against Persipura Jayapura.

Bandung United (loan)
He was signed for Bandung United to play in the Liga 2 in the 2019 season, on loan from Persib Bandung. He made 9 league appearances and scored 1 goal for Bandung United.

Persikabo 1973
Mulyadi was signed for Persikabo 1973 to play in Liga 1 in the 2022–23 season. He made his league debut on 3 September 2022 in a match against Borneo Samarinda at the Pakansari Stadium, Cibinong.

References

External links
 
 Agung Mulyadi at Liga Indonesia

Living people
1997 births
Indonesian footballers
Sportspeople from Bandung
Sportspeople from West Java
Association football wingers
Liga 1 (Indonesia) players
Liga 2 (Indonesia) players
Persib Bandung players
Bandung United F.C. players
Persikabo 1973 players